Beloostrov, from 1922 to World War II Krasnoostrov, is a municipal settlement in Kurortny District of the federal city of St. Petersburg, Russia, located on the Sestra River, Karelian Isthmus. Population:  The settlement has a railway station Beloostrov.

History
Beloostrov historically consists of two parts: Novy Beloostrov (New White Island) along the railway and Stary Beloostrov (Old White Island) several kilometers to the north, mostly belonging to Vsevolozhsky District of Leningrad Oblast under the name Sadovodstva Island. Until the Winter War Beloostrov was the last railway station before the Russia–Finland border.

Transportation
Beloostrov has been a key station of the Saint Petersburg-Vyborg railroad since 1870 (initially named Rayala) at the junction of Saint Petersburg–Zelenogorsk and Saint Petersburg–Sestroretsk–Beloostrov sections, being the final destination of many suburban passenger electric trains from the Finland Railroad Station.

References

Municipal settlements under jurisdiction of Saint Petersburg
Sankt-Peterburgsky Uyezd
Karelian Isthmus
Kurortny District